Toodyay Road is a mostly 2-lane undivided single carriageway in Western Australia, running from the north-eastern Perth suburb of Middle Swan, through Gidgegannup and Bailup, to the Wheatbelt town of Toodyay. It is signposted as State Route 50.

It rises up the Darling Scarp at Red Hill and travels through the easternmost section of the City of Swan.

Route description

Toodyay Road travels in a north-easterly direction from Perth's north-east to Toodyay, via the following towns and localities:

 Middle Swan
 Stratton
 Jane Brook
 Red Hill
 Gidgegannup
 Bailup

History

A road to Toodyay has existed since at least 1838. Originally referred to as Newcastle Road the road's name was not officially recorded until 1932 when the Midland Junction Municipal Council was advise by the department of Lands and Surveys of a number of unnamed roads in its area. It was decided that it would be a good opportunity to rename the road to reflect the name change of Newcastle to Toodyay which had occurred in 1910.

Future

There are long-term plans to bypass Great Eastern Highway's current ascent of the Darling Scarp, using part of Toodyay Road. Planning for a new major road network in Perth's eastern corridor began in the 1970s. Early planning efforts between 1978 and 1981 for a new highway reservation from Mundaring to Wooroloo encountered community opposition, and the Environmental Protection Authority (EPA) requested a more detailed environmental assessment. In 1985, a study into the primary east–west traffic routes in the area was commissioned by the Main Roads Department, Metropolitan Region Planning Authority, Shire of Mundaring, and Shire of Swan. It recommended a new alignment, known as the "Orange Route", be selected for the Perth to Adelaide National Highway. Alternative routes were identified using other colours as codenames. The new national highway would travel north-east along Toodyay Road from Roe Highway to beyond , and then deviate east via the proposed Orange Route to meet Great Eastern Highway near . The ultimate design of the highway includes grade separated interchanges for all of the roads that it intersects. The Orange Route received environmental approval on 22 November 1989. Detailed planning for the Clackline to Wooroloo section of the Orange Route was undertaken in 1998. , construction of the Orange Route is not a priority for Main Roads. The project was not in the forward works program, there was no indication of the expected starting date, and no recent cost analysis had been undertaken. Plans are still in development, but funding for the project is a federal government responsibility.

See also

Notes

References

External links

Main Roads Western Australia

Highways and freeways in Perth, Western Australia
Highways in rural Western Australia
Articles containing video clips